The Breeders' Cup Filly & Mare Sprint is a 7-furlong (1408 m) Weight for Age stakes race for thoroughbred fillies and mares three years old and up.  As its name implies, it is a part of the Breeders' Cup World Championships, the de facto year-end championship for North American thoroughbred racing, generally held in the United States (also held one time in Canada). The race is run on a dirt course (either natural dirt or a synthetic surface such as Polytrack).

The race was run for the first time in 2007 during the first day of the expanded Breeders' Cup at that year's host track, Monmouth Park Racetrack in Oceanport, New Jersey.  In 2009, the race became a Grade I event.

The 2007 race was held at a distance of 6 furlongs (1207 m) instead of the normal distance of 7 furlongs because of the configuration of the dirt track at Monmouth Park.

Automatic Berths 
Beginning in 2007, the Breeders' Cup developed the Breeders' Cup Challenge, a series of races in each division that allotted automatic qualifying bids to winners of defined races. Each of the fourteen divisions has multiple qualifying races. Note though that one horse may win multiple challenge races, while other challenge winners will not be entered in the Breeders' Cup for a variety of reasons such as injury or travel considerations.

In the Filly & Mare Sprint division, runners are limited to 14 and there are up to three automatic berths. The 2022 "Win and You're In" races were:
 the Princess Rooney Stakes, a Grade 2 race run in July at Gulfstream Park in Florida 
 the Ballerina Stakes, a Grade 1 race at Saratoga Race Course in  upstate New York  
 the Thoroughbred Club of America Stakes, a Grade 2 race at Keeneland Race Course in Kentucky

Records

Most wins:
 2 – Groupie Doll (2012, 2013)

Most wins by a jockey:
 3 – Irad Ortiz Jr. (2017, 2018, 2022)

Most wins by a trainer:
 2 – William Bradley (2012, 2013)
 2 – Chad C. Brown (2015, 2022)

Most wins by an owner:
 2 – Fred Bradley,  William Bradley, Brent Burns, Carl Hurst (2012, 2013)

Winners of the Breeders' Cup Filly & Mare Sprint 

† – Run at 6 furlongs

See also 
 Breeders' Cup Filly & Mare Sprint "top three finishers" and starters
 Breeders' Cup World Thoroughbred Championships
 American thoroughbred racing top attended events

References
 Breeders' Cup official website

Racing Post:

Graded stakes races in the United States
Grade 1 stakes races in the United States
Filly and Mare Sprint
Sprint category horse races for fillies and mares
Horse races in the United States
Recurring sporting events established in 2007